SatZ is a well known SAT instance solver. It was developed by Prof. Chu Min Li, a computer science researcher. The Z stands for the last version of SAT solvers.

References 

 Chu Min Li and Anbulagan: Heuristics Based on Unit Propagation for Satisfiability Problems. Proceedings of IJCAI, 366–371, 1997

SAT solvers